Melisa Şenolsun (born 24 September 1996) is a Turkish actress.

Life and career
Melisa Şenolsun was born on 24 September 1996 in İzmir. Şenolsun is a graduate of İzmir Gelişim College Anatolian High School and studied at Istanbul University State Conservatory. Her older brother, Efecan Şenolsun, is also an actor. She became interested in acting at a young age and through watching her older sister on stage. At the age of 6 she started participating in theatre plays. Aside from acting, she took gymnastic and ballet lessons for years. She made her television debut in 2015 with a role in the series Tatlı Küçük Yalancılar and depicted the character of Hande. For a while, she worked at the Uğur Mumcu Bornova State Theatre. She was then cast in Kiralık Aşk, portraying the character of "Sude". She had her first leading role in the series Umuda Kelepçe Vurulmaz as "Ceren" opposite Mert Yazıcıoğlu. In 2018, she made her debut in the series Nefes Nefese and depicted the character of Rüya Kıran.

Şenolsun had her first cinematic experience with the movie Babam, directed by Nihat Durak. Her breakthrough came with her role in the Netflix original series Atiye. In 2021, she starred in the series Masumlar Apartmanı and portrayed the character of Rüya, a delicate but reckless girl, who is thrown into dangers.

Personal life
Şenolsun had been dating actor Ozan Dolunay for almost three and a half years, the couple broke up in 2019. Following the breakup, she started dating Umut Evirgen.

Filmography

Film

Television

References

External links

1996 births
Actresses from İzmir
Turkish film actresses
Turkish television actresses
Living people